Carramar is a suburb of Sydney, in the state of New South Wales, Australia. Carramar is located 30 kilometres west of the Sydney central business district, in the local government area of the City of Fairfield and is part of the Greater Western Sydney region.

History
Carramar's name comes from an aboriginal word meaning "shade of trees". The first land grant in the area was made by Governor King in 1803. One of Sydney's oldest trees, the Bland Oak, was planted in the suburb in the 1830s by William Bland. When the railway station opened here in 1924 it was called South Fairfield. However, the area had been known as Carramar since at least the 1850s and the name of the station was changed to Carramar in 1926. A post office was opened the following year as the local population began to swell.

Demographics
According to the 2016 census of population, there were 3,550 residents in Carramar. 37.6% of people were born in Australia. The most common other countries of birth were Vietnam 14.6%, China (excludes SARs and Taiwan) 3.6%, Iraq 3.1%, New Zealand 2.6% and Lebanon 2.3%. 26.5% of people only spoke English at home. Other languages spoken at home included Vietnamese 18.2%, Arabic 11.2%, Cantonese 3.7%, Mandarin 3.3% and Spanish 3.1%. The most common religious groups were Catholic 22.3%, Buddhism 15.4%, Islam 15.2%, No Religion 14.4% and Not stated 9.7%. Christianity was the largest religious group reported overall (47.9%).

Schools
Carramar Public School features an infants and primary school, although the school technically falls within the suburb of Villawood.

Commercial areas and transport
Carramar has a small commercial shopping centre, and a small industrial area. Carramar railway station is on the Bankstown Line of the Sydney Trains network. Fairfield Precinct Park is adjacent to those residing in the suburb's northern outskirts. Ruby Manor, situated in Ruby Street, is a modern apartment block that is a nursing home and an aged care facility that has over 90 beds and 60 rooms.

Economy
Carramar is one of Sydney's poorest suburbs according to the Australian Bureau of Statistics. Residents have referred to Carramar as "the forgotten suburb" due to it having damaged footpaths, scarce street lighting and no disabled access for its train station. To improve the suburb, Fairfield City Council had planned in 2018 to establish a 3,200m2 park in between Carramar and Villawood.

Notable people 
 Maria Tran - actress, filmmaker

References

Suburbs of Sydney
City of Fairfield